Sixteen ships of the Royal Navy have borne the name HMS Cygnet, the name given to a young swan:

  was a 3-gun pink built in 1585 and condemned in 1603.
  was a 10-gun ship, originally a privateer. She was purchased in 1643 and sold in 1654.
  was an 8-gun sloop launched in 1657 and sold in 1664.
  was a survey vessel purchased in 1684. She foundered in 1687.
  was an 8-gun fireship purchased in 1688 and captured by the French in 1693.
  was an 18-gun sloop, formerly the French Guirlande. She was captured in 1758 and sold in 1768.
  was a 14-gun  launched in 1776 and sold in 1802.
  was a 16-gun  launched in 1804 and wrecked in 1815.
  was a 10-gun  launched in 1819 that became a Post Office Packet Service packet, sailing out of Falmouth, Cornwall. She was sold in 1835.
  was an 8-gun  brig-sloop launched in 1840, renamed WV30 when handed to HM Coastguard in 1863, and broken up by 1877.
  was a  wooden screw gunvessel launched in 1860 and broken up in 1868.
  was a  composite screw gunboat launched in 1874 and broken up in 1889.
  was a  destroyer launched in 1898 and sold in 1920.
  was a C-class destroyer launched in 1931. She was transferred to the Royal Canadian Navy as the River-class destroyer  in 1937 and was sold for scrapping in 1947.
  was a  launched in 1942 and broken up in 1956.
  was a  launched in 1975 and sold in 1996.

Royal Navy ship names